Happiness in Self Destruction is the third studio album by American rock band The Plot in You. The album was released on October 16, 2015. It is the band's first and only album released through StaySick after leaving Rise Records.

Background
The album's release was preceded by three singles, "My Old Ways", "Take Me Away", and "Dear Old Friend". A music video for "Take Me Away" was released, as well as a music video for "Time Changes Everything", released in June 2016.

Landon Tewers recorded the album in his home studio over two and a half years. He played every instrument on the album. Producer Josh Schroeder assisted in all post-production, as well as writing the drum tracks.

Critical reception

Happiness in Self Destruction received generally positive reviews. Sputnikmusic gave the album 3 out of 5, stating "Happiness in Self Destruction is Landon's most mature and intensely personal record yet, and those factors work in its favor. However, it's also self-absorbed, overlong, and lacks cohesion." It Djents gave the album 9 out of 10, stating "The band is giving us fifteen songs of honest and emotional music, that shows a lot of ambition. You can clearly hear and feel the emotions and the love, that was put into this record. There are many interesting details and a lot of things to be discovered, but overall they do have a concept."

Track listing

Personnel
Credits adapted from AllMusic.

The Plot in You

 Landon Tewers – vocals, guitars, bass, engineering, production
 Mathis Arnell – drums

Additional personnel
 Josh Schroeder – mixing, mastering, drum programming, percussion, production
 Josh Childress – design, layout
 Paige Farrow – cover photo, photography

Charts

References

External links

Happiness in Self Destruction at YouTube (streamed copy where licensed)

2015 albums
The Plot in You albums